Rusca Montană (or Ruskberg) is a commune in Caraș-Severin County of Western Romania with a population of 2,095 people. It is composed of two villages, Rusca Montană and Rușchița (Ruszkica or Ruszkicatelep). It is situated in the historical region of Banat.

Rusca Montană is notable for the marble deposits nearby, which include Rușchița marble.

Péter Pan 
Péter Pan (21 September 1897 – 19 September 1918) was an Austro-Hungarian soldier, died in the battle of Monte Grappa, final stages of World War I. He was born at Ruszkabánya-Krassó-Szörény (currently Rusca Montană). A museum has been opened in Rusca Montană in his honour and the street where he was born bears his name.
The namesake with the well-known literary character makes him famous, his tomb is one of the most visited of monte Grappa War Cemetery in Italy and flowers, pebbles and shells are often deposited there, as told by italian journalist Ferdinando Celi in a book about his story.

References

Communes in Caraș-Severin County
Localities in Romanian Banat